William Gemmell Alexander  (19 August 1918 – 10 June 2014) was a British colonial officer and co-operator. He was director of the International Co-operative Alliance from 1963 to 1968.

References 

British cooperative organizers
1918 births
2014 deaths
Alumni of Brasenose College, Oxford
People from Cheshire
Colonial Service officers